Jhow Hendric Benavídez Banegas (born 26 December 1995) is a Honduran professional footballer who plays as an attacking midfielder for Real España. He represented Honduras in the football competition at the 2016 Summer Olympics.

International career
Benavídez got his first call up to the senior Honduras side for a friendly against Belize in October 2016.

References

1995 births
Living people
Honduran footballers
Olympic footballers of Honduras
Real C.D. España players
Honduras international footballers
People from Atlántida Department
Association football midfielders
Central American Games gold medalists for Honduras
Central American Games medalists in football
2015 CONCACAF U-20 Championship players
Footballers at the 2016 Summer Olympics
2021 CONCACAF Gold Cup players